Jamia Hafsa (جامعة حفصة) is a madrassa adjacent to the Lal Masjid Mosque Islamabad, the capital of Pakistan. The mosque and its seminaries are overseen by cleric Abdul Aziz Ghazi.

The seminary, and the adjoining Lal Mosque, was owned by two brothers and clerics, Maulana Abdul Aziz and Abdul Rashid Ghazi, until the Lal Masjid operation started and in the ensuing struggle, older brother Abdul Aziz was arrested and younger one Rashid Ghazi was killed.

The seminary is conservative in nature.

History
Hafsa, the female Islamic seminary was established in 1992 as a sister branch of Jamia Ul Ulom al Islamia al Faridia Also Known As The Faridia University. The schools were founded by Maulana Abdullah Ghazi in 1992, who remained Chancellor until he was assassinated by unknown gunmen in October 1998. The school is now lead by Maulana Abdul Aziz Ghazi.

After Lal Masjid operation, the then Government demolished the original school. Since then the school has been rebuilt in Islamabad's Sector G-7. Several other branches have also been built at other places in Pakistan.

See also
 Jamia Uloom-ul-Islamia

References

External links
Jamia Hafsa
Lal Masjid
 Lal Masjid Official
 Jamia Hafsa Official
Newsline - The Battered Half

1992 establishments in Pakistan
Deobandi Islamic universities and colleges
Islamic universities and colleges
Educational institutions established in 1992
Islam in Pakistan
Madrasas in Pakistan
Universities and colleges in Islamabad